The Aerodyne Systems Vector is a family of American ultralight aircraft that was designed by Berndt Petterson, Mike McCarron and Paul Yarnell and produced by Aerodyne Systems, introduced in 1982. The aircraft was supplied as a kit for amateur construction.

Design and development
The Vector owes many of its design concepts to the earlier Hill Humbug and was later to inspire and influence the Ultralight Flight Mirage.

It features a cable-braced high-wing, V-tail, a single-seat, open cockpit, tricycle landing gear and a single engine in pusher configuration.

The aircraft is made from bolted-together aluminum tubing, with its flying surfaces covered in Dacron sailcloth. Its 80% double-surface  span wing is supported by cables running from an inverted "V" kingpost. The landing gear's nose wheel is not steerable and a small tail caster is provided. The pilot is accommodated on an open seat, without a windshield. The engine is mounted at the wing's leading edge and powers the trailing edge-mounted pusher propeller through an extension shaft.

The Vector series was very popular in its day and a great number were produced.

Variants
Vector 600
Initial model, with a two-axis control system, powered by two  Chrysler engines.
Vector 610
Improved model, with a structurally strengthened airframe, enlarged spoilers, elliptical wing tip extensions and powered by a single  Zenoah G-25B single cylinder, two-stroke engine.
Vector 627
Powered by a single  single cylinder, two-stroke Rotax 277 engine.
Vector 627 SR
Powered by a single  single cylinder, two-stroke Rotax 377 engine.

Specifications (Vector 610)

References

External links
Photo of Vector 610

1980s United States ultralight aircraft
Homebuilt aircraft
Single-engined pusher aircraft
Parasol-wing aircraft
Vector 600
V-tail aircraft